Ajay Jadav Mandal (born 25 February 1996) is an Indian cricketer. He made his first-class debut for Chhattisgarh in the 2016–17 Ranji Trophy on 6 October 2016. He made his Twenty20 debut for Chhattisgarh in the 2016–17 Inter State Twenty-20 Tournament on 29 January 2017. He made his List A debut for Chhattisgarh in the 2018–19 Vijay Hazare Trophy on 30 September 2018.

For the 2023 Season Ajay Mandal has signed for Doncaster Town Cricket Club as their overseas pro.

References

External links
 

1996 births
Living people
Indian cricketers
Chhattisgarh cricketers
People from Durg